Daniel C. Richman is an American attorney. He is the Paul J. Kellner Professor of Law at Columbia Law School.

Education
Richman received a bachelor's degree from Harvard University in 1980 and a J.D. from Yale Law School in 1984.

Career
Richman served as a federal prosecutor in the U.S. Attorney's Office for the Southern District of New York. He was the Brendan Moore Professor in Advocacy at Fordham Law School before taking his current position at Columbia. He was a special government employee for the Federal Bureau of Investigation (FBI).

Following the June 8, 2017 public hearing at the United States Senate Select Committee on Intelligence, Richman confirmed to reporters that he was the person former FBI Director James Comey had instructed to reveal the contents of Comey's memos detailing conversation with President Donald Trump. Richman and Comey are longtime friends, and Richman's faculty page describes him as an advisor to Comey.

References

Living people
Harvard University alumni
Yale Law School alumni
Columbia Law School faculty
Year of birth missing (living people)